Ochetellus glaber (also known as the black household ant) is a species of ant native to Australia. A member of the genus Ochetellus in the subfamily Dolichoderinae, it was described by Austrian entomologist Gustav Mayr in 1862. Aside from Australia, O. glaber has been introduced to a number of countries, including China, India, Japan, New Zealand, the Philippines and the United States, where it has established itself in Hawaii and Florida. It has been found on Lord Howe Island, New Caledonia, Norfolk Island, Réunion and the Solomon Islands. The ant's colour ranges from brown to black.

Described as an arboreal nesting species, O. glaber lives in open or savannah woodland areas, nesting under stones, old dry logs, in hollow trees and plant stems, and rotten wood. Nests can also be constructed in buildings and structures, specifically in pavings, ceilings and walls. It is both diurnal and nocturnal, forming long trails from trees in search of food such as honeydew and insects. It has developed some associations with certain flowers and also tends to associate with some insects, such as mealybugs and aphids. During the nuptial flight, queens mate with either one or multiple males; males only mate with a single queen. Sometimes, a subset of a colony may leave the main colony for an alternative nest site as an act of dispersal. O. glaber often invades human homes to feed on household foods, and is considered a household pest. It has been intercepted numerous times in the United States, where it has the potential to disrupt the biological control of certain pests and cause long-term ecological impacts in areas where it is not native.

Taxonomy
Ochetellus glaber was originally described as Hypoclinea glabra by Austrian entomologist Gustav Mayr in his "Myrmecologische studien" in 1862. The ant was described from syntype workers and males Mayr collected from Sydney, Australia, now preserved in the Natural History Museum, London. Its placement in Hypoclinea was relatively short, as Mayr transferred it to the genus Iridomyrmex as Iridomyrmex glaber in 1865. Its placement in Iridomyrmex was accepted for more than a century, until entomologist Steve Shattuck revised the genus in 1992 and transferred the ant into a new genus, Ochetellus. He also designated O. glaber as the type species of the genus. In 2011, evidence emerged that O. glaber represents a species complex, indicating that the current taxa may need to be split.

O. glaber has two synonyms, Iridomyrmex itoi and Iridomyrmex itoi abbotti. I. itoi was described as a separate species, while I. itoi abbotti was recognised as a subspecies. The subspecies was short-lived, and was synonymised with I. itoi in 1910, and in the 1950s I. itoi was first noted to be similar to O. glaber. Despite the similarities, I. itoi remained a valid species until a 1995 publication confirmed its synonymy with O. glaber. It is commonly known as the black house ant or the tramp ant.

Description

The antenna has 12 segments, the scapes of which are half as long as the head. Its antennal sockets and posterior clypeal margin are separated from one another by a small distance, perhaps less than the minimum width of the antennal scapes. Eyes range in size, being either medium to large, with more than six facets (lenses that make up the compound eye of an insect). The dorsum of the mesosoma has distinct metanotal grooves and lack erect hairs. The propodeum has a distinct  protrusion which causes the slope to be strongly concave. The ant's waist has only one segment. The petiole (the narrow waist) is upright and is not flattened. The gaster has a ventral slit. Constriction between the third and fourth abdominal segment is not visible. The ant's colour ranges from brown to black. The body is brown in colour, but the back of the body is brownish-black, and the mandibles, legs and antennae are yellow. The head and thorax are noticeably wrinkled.

Compared to older larvae, young larva bodies are stouter and the outlines are straighter. Thirteen differentiated somites are present. Spinules (small spines or thorns) are more prominent at the posterior end. The length of the body hair is extremely short, measuring 0.002–0.015mm long. The body is short and stout. The integument (a tough outer protective layer of an organism) are spinulose, bearing small spines. These spinules are in short transverse rows both ventrally and posteriorly. Body hair is significant but few hairs are found on the head. Mandibles contain a large apical tooth. The maxillary and labial palps (organs which aid sensory function in eating) have three sensilla (a sensory organ protruding from the cuticle). Unlike other Dolichoderines, the larvae are yellow, not white.

The karyotype of O. glaber has been described. It has eight metacentric chromosomes, four submetacentric to acrocentric, and two submetacentric chromosomes.

Subspecies
Three subspecies of O. glaber are recognised: O. glaber clarithorax, O. glaber consimilis and O. glaber sommeri.

Distribution and habitat

O. glaber inhabits many areas in Oceania. In Australia, its range extends from coastal Queensland and New South Wales to south-west Western Australia. O. glaber was introduced to New Zealand around 1927 and had become well-established by the 1940s. While the ant has largely remained in Auckland and some suburbs, New Zealand authorities have intercepted specimens elsewhere several times, and it may spread to other New Zealand cities. It is regarded as a potential pest, though not a major household one. Additionally, specimens of O. glaber have been collected on Lord Howe Island, New Caledonia, Norfolk Island, Solomon Islands and the former New Hebrides.

Other locations where O. glaber has been found include Réunion, India and the Philippines. In India, it has been collected from the states of Haryana, Himachal Pradesh, Karnataka, Maharashtra and Uttarakhand. It has also been found in China and Macao, as well as Japan and Sri Lanka. In the United States, O. glaber was first recorded in Hawaii in 1977, where it originated from Australia and Japan. In Hawaii, it is presently found on Kauai, Maui, Oahu, and the Island of Hawaii. It was also found in Florida, where collected specimens were found in a queen palm (Syagrus romanzoffiana) stump. It is abundant yet localised species in Orange County, being found in dead wood or in tussocks of marsh grasses.

O. glaber is an arboreal nesting species. It lives in open areas or savannah woodland, nesting under stones or old dry logs, or else in hollow trees, plant stems or rotten wood. It is also often found in gardens, where it may be conspicuous. O. glaber has also been found in mountain forests, wet forests, in pastures, garden flower tubs and dried palmetto frond. In buildings and structures, O. glaber nests in crevices and cavities such as rockeries, paving and in brickwork. It also nests in ceilings, walls, and subfloor areas.

Behaviour and ecology

O. glaber is omnivorous, forming long trails on tree trunks to seek sweet substances such as honeydew and to hunt insects. The ant is both active during the day and night. Activity increases during the night or on overcast days, peaking during early mornings and late evening to early night. Nocturnal activity varies but is either minimal or non-existent. O. glaber consumes carcasses of dead birds, sea turtles, parrot fish, fruit fly pupae and diamondback moth larvae. It also has a preference for fat, grease, plants and seeds. Galleries of the Formosan subterranean termite (Coptotermes formosanus) are often invaded by O. glaber, although mortality rates are substantially higher when big-headed ants (Pheidole megacephala) invade termite galleries.

The ant has developed associations with a range of organisms. Foraging workers often visit flowers for nectar, chiefly those of Pisonia, but also of Canavalia, Commicarpus, Ipomoea, Melanthera, Plumbago and Scaevola. O. glaber also associates with some insects, including the pineapple mealybug (Dysmicoccus brevipes) and aphids, which they import and tend with other bugs on domestic pot plants. O. glaber associates indirectly with Ananusia australis, an encyrtid parasitoid wasp.

During the nuptial flight, a queen may mate with multiple males while the males will only mate with a single queen, making them monogynous. Sometimes, colonies proliferate by "budding" (also called "satelliting" or "fractionating") whereby a subset of the colony, including queens, workers and brood (eggs, larvae and pupae) leave the main colony for an alternative nest site.

Relationship with humans
O. glaber is viewed as a pest.  Although it does not sting, it bites and, when crushed, produces a strong odour. It enters human homes to gather food, tracking across ceilings, beams and joists and drops ant debris onto surfaces below. The ant can also quickly spread because of its high reproduction and dispersal potential.

O. glaber is more potentially dangerous in some places than in others. The United States, and especially the state of California, prohibits the ant from entering lest it should disrupt the country's ecosystems. Its relationship with honeydew-producing insects and consumption of parasitoids could disrupt the biological control of certain pests, risking long-term ecological damage that could reduce biodiversity, disrupt natural communities, or change ecosystem processes. Therefore, the California Department of Food and Agriculture have intercepted the ant in nursery stock and fresh plants from Hawaii. California is especially vulnerable to O. glaber infestation because the state's climate resembles that of those regions where the ant already lives. Nonetheless, O. glaber is unlikely to lower crop yields, increase farming costs, degrade water supplies, or likely disrupt Californian agricultural commodity markets.

In New Zealand, the ant is found only in urban gardens and some homes.

References

Cited literature

External links

Dolichoderinae
Insects described in 1862
Hymenoptera of Australia
Hymenoptera of Asia
Pest insects
Household pest insects
Hymenoptera of New Zealand
Ants of New Zealand